The College of Engineering and Applied Science is the engineering and applied science college of the University of Cincinnati in Cincinnati, Ohio. It is the birthplace of the cooperative education (co-op) program and still holds the largest public mandatory cooperative education program at a public university in the United States. Today, it has a student population of around 4,898 undergraduate and 1,305 graduate students and is recognized annually as one of the top 100 engineering colleges in the US, ranking 83rd in 2020.

History

College of Engineering
The creation of the College of Engineering first began with the appointment of a Professor of Civil Engineering in 1874 and the organization of a Department of Engineering at the University of Cincinnati. Established as a college of the university in 1900, the College of Engineering's first dean was Harry Thomas Cory. In 1923 a six-year cooperative program was added in general engineering which led to dual degrees: a bachelor of engineering and a master of science. The college began offering courses in engineering through its own evening division in 1924 and by 1926 grew to include course work in applied arts. In the 1950s the college began to offer graduate instruction in every department. A joint project with the Engineer’s Council for Professional Development and local industry provided opportunities for engineers to pursue graduate degrees without leaving their jobs. In 1995, new class and research space was created with the opening of the Engineering Research Center, which was designed by architect and UC alum Michael Graves.

College of Applied Science
The College of Applied Science was an applied science college at the University of Cincinnati in Cincinnati, Ohio. Organized as the Ohio Mechanics Institute (OMI) in 1828, it merged with UC in 1969 and was renamed the OMI College of Applied Science in 1978. Formally the school was referred to as the College of Applied Science, CAS offered programs in the engineering technologies and related areas.

The first cooperative education (co-op) program
By 1906, Dean Herman Schneider established the first cooperative education (co-op) program in the United States. The program was established to support Theory with Practice, the belief being that engineers who graduated with both classroom instruction and practical training would be better prepared and have a better foundation to be successful in the practice of engineering. The college allows students to choose either an industry or a research track co-op. The program continues to be the largest mandatory cooperative education program at a public university in the United States and is annually ranked as one of the top 5 programs in the country. Additionally, this program has proven so successful in preparing graduates for their careers that more than 1,000 schools offer forms of it today.

Programs
The College offers programs spread across seven departments.  Except for the Department of Engineering Education which focuses on the Freshman curriculum, all Departments offer PhD programs, Masters of Science, Masters of Engineering, and Bachelors Programs.

Aerospace Engineering 

 Aerospace Engineering
 Engineering Mechanics
 Fire Science

Biomedical Engineering 

 Biomedical Engineering

Chemical Engineering and Environmental Engineering 

 Chemical Engineering
 Environmental Engineering
 Environmental Science

Civil and Architectural Engineering and Construction Management 

 Architectural Engineering
 Civil Engineering
 Construction Management

Electrical Engineering and Computer Science 

 Computer Engineering
 Computer Science
 Electrical Engineering
 Electrical Engineering Technology
 Engineering Education
 Cybersecurity Engineering

Engineering Education 

 Freshman Engineering Programs
 Research in Teaching and Learning
 Course Development
 Learning Center

Mechanical & Materials Engineering 

 Mechanical Engineering 
 Mechanical Engineering Technology
 Materials Engineering

ACCEND Program
The College of engineering and Applied Science also offers an ACCelerated ENgineering Degree program where students can graduate in 5 years with a bachelor's and master's degree. Students work with their academic adviser during their first year to determine if this program is suitable for them. Several of the programs offer MBA degrees in conjunction with the Lindner College of Business. the program options are listed below:

Aerospace with Aerospace master's, Aerospace with MBA, Chemical with Chemical master's, Chemical with MBA, Chemical with Materials master's, Civil with MBA, Civil with Environmental master's, Energy & Materials with MBA, Mechanical with MBA, Electrical with Computer Eng master's, Electrical with Electrical master's, Mechanical with Mechanical master's

Research Centers & Institutes
Aerosol and Air Quality Research Lab
Advanced Materials Characterization Center
Center of Academic Excellence in Cyber Operations
Center for Global Design & Manufacturing
Center for Medical Device Innovation & Entrepreneurship (MDIEP)
Center for Mobile and Distributed Computing
Center for Intelligent Propulsion and Advanced Life Management of Systems (CIPALMS)
Center for Robotics Research
Center for Surgical Innovation
Cleanroom
Collaboratory for Medical Innovation and Implementation
Digital Design Environments Laboratory (DDEL)
Environmental Analysis Service Center
National Science Foundation Industry University Cooperative Research for Intelligent Maintenance Systems (IMS)
National Science Foundation (NSF) Engineering Research Center for Revolutionizing Metallic Biomaterials
Next Mobility Lab
Ohio Center for Microfluidic Innovation
Radiological Assessment & Measurement Lab
Siemens Simulation Technology Center
Sustainable Solutions Laboratory
UC Simulation Center

Research Labs

Center Hill Research Center
Located at Center Hill Research Center, the Large Scale Test Facility (UCLSTF) is a state-of-art laboratory for testing of large-scale structural projects. The laboratory is served by a 30-ton overhead crane with a 5-ton auxiliary hook, and two 60-gallon per minute pumps. This facility is equipped with computerized controllers capable of controlling an array of sensors to allow testing of large to full-scale structural components and systems. The laboratory has a machine shop for fabrication of specimens, test fixtures, etc. and is equipped to allow testing of full-scale bridge girders and other linear elements up to 100' long, and full-scale buildings up to 2 stories high.

UC Simulation Center
The UC Simulation Center is a collaboration between UC CEAS and Procter & Gamble. Its purpose is to support undergraduate students (coops) and graduate students in doing research for Procter & Gamble. The intent is to not only provide short-term lower-cost simulation to P&G, but also to provide a source of highly trained experts in simulation, making them desirable for employment by Procter & Gamble. The center is also built around the next generation of students, utilizing virtual collaboration to enable flexibility in the working hours for the students.

Rankings
The College of Engineering and Applied Science is regularly ranked as one of the top engineering schools in the country. In the 2011 U.S. News & World Report rankings, the college was ranked 78th in the U.S.

2007 Faculty Scholarly Productivity Index
Environmental Engineering, 6th in the U.S.
Biomedical Sciences, 9th in the U.S.
U.S. News & World Report
Computer Engineering, 77th in the U.S.
Computer Science, 112th in the U.S.
Electrical Engineering, 89th in the U.S.
Environmental Engineering, 20th in the U.S.
Aerospace Engineering, 31st in the U.S.
Industrial Engineering, 37th in the U.S.
Civil Engineering, 48th in the U.S.
Materials Engineering, 50th in the U.S.
Mechanical Engineering, 60th in the U.S.

Facilities
Baldwin Hall was built in 1911 and is the headquarters for administration and academic classrooms. The building reopened in January 2002 after extensive renovations with computing laboratories, electronic classroom, and seminar rooms.

Rhodes Hall was built adjacent to Baldwin Hall to accommodate the expansion that took place in the 1970s. The building provides faculty offices, undergraduate and graduate laboratories, and a 12,000 sq. ft. high bay area. In fall of 2011, construction will begin on the 10,000 sf CEAS Alumni Learning Center in Rhodes Hall which will include labs, research space, and areas for students, professors, and alumni to gather and collaborate.

Mantei Center (formerly Engineering Research Center)
Opened in 1995, this facility houses state-of-the-art research laboratories and offices for graduate students and faculty. It is conveniently located adjacent to the existing engineering complex and was designed to look like a 4-cylinder engine. It was recently renamed to honor distinguished professor Thomas Mantei.

Old Chemistry Building
Used for offices, classrooms, and laboratories. Many engineering departments, and UC colleges, share the space for research, administration, instruction, and program support.

References

External links
University of Cincinnati College of Engineering and Applied Science official site
History of the College of Engineering
University of Cincinnati Simulation Center
Cooperative Engineer, Student & Alumni Publication from 1921 to 1975

Engineering schools and colleges in the United States
Engineering universities and colleges in Ohio
University of Cincinnati
Educational institutions established in 1874
1874 establishments in Ohio